Zack Sanchez (born October 11, 1993) is a former American football cornerback. He played college football at Oklahoma.

Early years
Sanchez attended Central High School in Keller, Texas. He originally committed to Baylor University to play college football, but changed his choice to the University of Oklahoma.

College career
After redshirting his freshman year at Oklahoma in 2012, Sanchez became a starter in 2013. He remained a starter throughout his career, finishing with 37 career starts. For his career he recorded 134 tackles, 15 interceptions and three touchdowns. After his junior year, Sanchez entered the 2016 NFL Draft.

Professional career

Carolina Panthers 
Sanchez was selected in the fifth round, 141st overall, by the Carolina Panthers in the 2016 NFL Draft. On September 3, 2016, he was waived by the Panthers as part of final roster cuts and was signed to the practice squad the next day. He was promoted to the active roster on October 7, 2016. He was placed on injured reserve on November 25, 2016 with a groin injury.

On September 1, 2017, Sanchez was waived/injured by the Panthers and placed on injured reserve. He was released on September 7, 2017. He was re-signed to the Panthers' practice squad on October 17, 2017. He signed a reserve/future contract with the Panthers on January 8, 2018.

On May 14, 2018, Sanchez was waived by the Panthers.

San Antonio Commanders 
On October 12, 2018, Sanchez signed with the San Antonio Commanders of the AAF. In the season opener against the San Diego Fleet, Sanchez picked off a Philip Nelson pass in the endzone to seal the victory for the Commanders. The league ceased operations in April 2019.

Saskatchewan Roughriders
Sanchez signed with the Saskatchewan Roughriders on March 3, 2020. He was released on July 3, 2021.

Personal life
Sanchez's mother is of Mexican heritage.

References

External links
 Oklahoma Sooners bio

1993 births
Living people
Players of American football from Fort Worth, Texas
American football cornerbacks
Oklahoma Sooners football players
Carolina Panthers players
San Antonio Commanders players
American sportspeople of Mexican descent
Saskatchewan Roughriders players